Noël Rakotondramboa is a Malagasy politician. A member of the Tiako I Madagasikara party, he was the First Vice-President of the Senate of Madagascar from 2008 to 2009.

References

Year of birth missing (living people)
Living people
Members of the Senate (Madagascar)
Tiako I Madagasikara politicians
Place of birth missing (living people)
21st-century Malagasy politicians